Boundless is a Spanish historical drama and adventure television miniseries directed by Simon West that premiered on 10 June 2022. It stars Álvaro Morte and Rodrigo Santoro as Juan Sebastián Elcano and Ferdinand Magellan respectively. It was created on the 500th anniversary of the First Circumnavigation of the World.

Plot 
The plot is a fictionalised account of the First Circumnavigation of the World, tracking the 1519–22 voyage initiated by Ferdinand Magellan and completed by Juan Sebastián Elcano.

Cast

Episodes

Production 

The project is the result of the collaboration agreement signed by RTVE and the Spanish Ministry of Defence in March 2018. RTVE and Amazon Prime Video unveiled the project in February 2020. Simon West was announced as director, and MONO Films and KILIMA Media as production companies. Several cast members were disclosed on 22 April 2021. The series consists of 6 episodes each with a running time of around 40 minutes, with a total budget of €20 million. Production began filming in Olite, Navarre, on 26 April 2021. Shooting locations also included the  beach in Getxo, Biscay, and the Dominican Republic.
According to Amezcua, the most important historical license in the screenplay was bringing Magellan and Elcano together on the same ship.

Release 
Amazon Prime Video scheduled an exclusive premiere in Spain and Latin America for 10 June 2022.

References

External links
 

2020s Spanish drama television series
Television series set in the 16th century
Spanish-language television shows
Television shows filmed in Spain
Television shows filmed in the Dominican Republic
Spanish adventure television series
Nautical television series
Spanish television miniseries
2020s television miniseries
2022 Spanish television series debuts
Spanish-language Amazon Prime Video original programming